The Irish Human Rights and Equality Commission (IHREC) is a statutory body which is publicly funded but independent of government. It was formed as a result of the merger of the Equality Authority and the Irish Human Rights Commission (IHRC); both former bodies were dissolved and their functions transferred to the IHREC.

Sinéad Gibney is the Chief Commissioner of the Irish Human Rights and Equality Commission.

History
The IHREC was established by the Irish Human Rights and Equality Commission Act 2014 to protect and promote human rights and equality in Ireland and to encourage a culture of respect for human rights, equality and intercultural understanding across the state. The Irish Human Rights and Equality Commission Act 2014 was signed into law by President Michael D. Higgins on 27 July 2014.

The IHREC is Ireland’s National Human Rights Institution (NHRI), which means that its powers and functions fully comply with the Paris Principles. The Principles, which set out the role, composition, status and functions of NHRIs, were endorsed by the United Nations General Assembly in December 1993. The IHREC also serves as the National Equality Body for Ireland.

Staff 
The Commission is composed of a Chief Commissioner and 14 members. The members of the commission are nominated by the Government of Ireland and formally appointed by the President Michael D. Higgins

Sinéad Gibney is the Chief Commissioner of the Irish Human Rights and Equality Commission.

Emily Logan was the first Chief Commissioner and served from 2014 to 2020.

The Director of the Irish Human Rights and Equality Commission is Laurence Bond, the Director is also the Accounting Officer for the organisation.

Functions 
The functions of the IHREC as outlined in the Irish Human Rights and Equality Act 2014 are:
 To protect and promote human rights and equality,
 To encourage the development of a culture of respect for human rights, equality, and intercultural understanding in the State,
 To promote understanding and awareness of the importance of human rights and equality in the State,
 To encourage good practice in intercultural relations, to promote tolerance and acceptance of diversity in the State and respect for the freedom and dignity of each person, and
 To work towards the elimination of human rights abuses, discrimination and prohibited conduct.

Work
The Commission’s founding legislation provides a range of ways to address human rights and equality issues from engagement to enforcement. The Commission aims to bring about change through legal means, policy and legislative advice, awareness and education and partnerships across civil society.

Your Rights Information Service 
The Irish Human Rights and Equality Commission operates a Your Rights Information Service which provides the public with information on rights and remedies available under equality and human rights law in Ireland.

Changing Places facility
The Irish Human Rights and Equality Commission offers a fully accessible Changing Places toilet facility for people with disabilities and carers to drop in their offices at 16-22 Green Street, Dublin 7.

References

External links
 Irish Human Rights and Equality Commission
 Irish Human Rights and Equality Commission Act 2014

National human rights institutions
Human rights organisations based in Ireland
2014 establishments in Ireland
Department of Children, Equality, Disability, Integration and Youth